J Rabbit is a South Korean acoustic pop female duo under the label friendz.net. They debuted on November 27, 2010 with the single "Take One". The group's name is derived from combining the letter ‘J’ from their matching surname ‘Jung’ and the year of the rabbit, 1987, which they were both born in.

Members

Jung Hye-sun (정혜선)
 Birthdate: 
 Lead vocals
 Graduate of Seoul Institute of the Arts

Jung Da-woon (정다운)
 Birthdate: 
 Instruments, songwriter 
 Graduate of Seoul Institute of the Arts

Artistry 

J Rabbit has a unique style focusing on creating music for everyone no matter their age and aiming to console people with their music. Their songs are light hearted, relaxing, and up-beat while using unique instruments like bells, xylophones, violins, cellos, and melodeon accordions. An editor working with Seoulbeats, Leslie Tumbaco mentions "They have such a keen understanding of the basics of music, which makes their stripped-down melodies so magnetic". Along with the light hearted songs their performances are very light hearted and fun as well, drawing in audiences and attention with their personalities.

Discography

Albums

Singles

Soundtracks

Collaborations

Filmography

Awards and nominations

Mnet 20's Choice Awards 

|-
| 2013
| J Rabbit
|20's Hot Band 
|

References

External links 
 Youtube
 Facebook
 Website

2010 establishments in South Korea
Musical groups established in 2010
Pop music duos
South Korean musical duos
Female musical duos